Jagmohan Raju is an American marketing professor and author. He is the Joseph J. Aresty Professor and Director of the Wharton-Indian School of Business Program at Wharton Business School, University of Pennsylvania. Professor Raju is internationally known for his research on Pricing. He is the author of the book Smart Pricing.

Education
Raju has a Ph.D., M.S. and M.A. degrees from Stanford University, an MBA from the Indian Institute of Management, Ahmedabad, and a BTech from the Indian Institute of Technology, Delhi.

External links
Wharton Department Page

References

Living people
American male writers of Indian descent
University of Pennsylvania faculty
Stanford University alumni
Indian Institute of Management Ahmedabad alumni
IIT Delhi alumni
Wharton School of the University of Pennsylvania faculty
Year of birth missing (living people)